Group C of the UEFA Women's Euro 2013 consisted of England, France, Russia and Spain. Matches were staged in Linköping and Norrköping from 12 to 18 July 2013.

France won the group and advanced to the knockout stage along with group runners-up Spain. Russia finished in third place with an equal number of points as Group A's Denmark, but the Russian team was eliminated in a drawing of lots to determine which of the two teams would advance as one of the best third-placed teams. England finished bottom of the group and so was also eliminated from the tournament.

Standings

France vs Russia

England vs Spain

England vs Russia

Spain vs France

France vs England

Russia vs Spain

Notes and references

External links
Group C at UEFA's official website

Group C
Group
Group
2013–14 in Russian football
2013–14 in Spanish women's football